Christine Spengler (born 1945) is a French war photographer. Since 1970, she has photographed and reported on conflicts, primarily from the point of view of the victims of war.

She worked freelance as a photographer for Sipa-Press, Corbis-Sygma, and AP, while she documented wars in Chad, Northern Ireland, Vietnam, Cambodia, Lebanon, Western Sahara, Kurdistan, Nicaragua, Kosovo, Afghanistan, and Iraq, among others. Her work has appeared in news publications worldwide, including Paris-Match, Time, Newsweek, El País, The New York Times, and Le Monde. She photographed the Christian Dior winter 2018/2019 ready-to-wear Collection.

Early life 

Born in Alsace, France, Spengler moved to Madrid at the age of seven to live with her aunt and uncle. There, she studied French and Spanish literature in order to become a writer.

Career

Her start 

At the age of 23, Spengler and her younger brother Eric, left Madrid. While travelling through Chad during the Toubou Wars, Spengler borrowed her brother's camera and photographed soldiers headed into battle. For taking the picture, Spengler and her brother were arrested and held for 23 days in prison on speculation they were spies or journalists. Despite the arrest, Spengler continued to focus on war photography, specifically on the adapted daily life of women and children in the bomb targeted cities and the consequences that followed after war.

Nylon magazine 

Spengler then began to work for The Nylon magazine, photographing war and protests in Northern Ireland. Spengler photographed children and other civilians of the war. She would immerse herself in the culture, as she put on a veil in the 1979 Iranian Revolution, to capture intimate shots of her subjects. These photographs were in black and white.

Sipa Press and Life magazine 

Later, Spengler worked with Sipa Press on an assignment in Bangladesh to photograph a Pakistan leader returning home after nine years as a captive. As she befriended the leader's wife, she was invited to a private gathering, unopened to the press. Life Magazine signed a contract with her on the spot, where they published many of her works.

Associated Press and Vietnam 

After working with Life, she worked with Associated Press during the Vietnam War where she photographed the front lines. She stayed several months in Vietnam before receiving news of her brother Eric's suicide. She went on to photograph many other wars, from a civilian's perspective, gaining worldwide attention for a perspective few war photographers take.

Fashion 

Spengler was also able to begin working in the fashion world when Maria Grazia Chuiri, Dior's first female creative director, asked her to shoot the AW18 collection. The collection recreated the 1968 student protests where the models marched like an army. There Spengler was able to build trust with the models immediately due to her background and achievements. She referenced the trust back to a shoot she did with an Iranian woman during the 1979 Islamic revolution - "If a man was trying to photograph women he would be deemed a spy and only be able to capture artificial sides of women in war."

Spengler has won several prizes for her work as a reporter, in particular, the SCAM Prize (Paris) for her report on women in the war in 1998 and the Femme de l'Année (Woman of the Year) Prize in Brussels in 2002. She had a major one-person retrospective exhibition in 2003 at Visa pour l'Image in Perpignan, France.

Publications

    Christine Spengler, Une femme dans la guerre, éditions Ramsay, 1991.
    Christine Spengler, Vierges et toreros, éditions Marval, 2003
    Christine Spengler, Années de guerre, éditions Marval, 2003.
    Laure Guibault, « Christine Spengler prend son pied », dans : Ynox, n° 10, avril 2005, p. 30-35.
    Christine Spengler, Une femme dans la guerre : 1970-2005, Des femmes. Antoinette Fouque, 2006.
    Christine Spengler, Ibiza y Formentera eternas. La serenidad recobrada, Camara de Commercio, Ibiza y Formentera, 2009.
    Christine Spengler, L'Opéra du monde, Cherche midi, 2016.
    Christine Spengler, Série indochinoise, hommage à Marguerite Duras, Cherche midi, 2017.

References

External links
Audio oral history, with selected photographs
Gallery and biography
Interview with Spengler at Dior

1945 births
Living people
French photojournalists
War photographers
French women photographers
20th-century French women artists
20th-century women photographers
People from Alsace
Women photojournalists